Nîmes (Latin: Nemausus) is the prefecture of the Gard department in the Occitanie region of Southern France. Located between the Mediterranean Sea and Cévennes, the commune of Nîmes has an estimated population of 148,561 (2019).

Dubbed the most Roman city outside Italy, Nîmes has a rich history dating back to the Roman Empire when the city had a population of 50,000–60,000 and was the regional capital. Several famous monuments are in Nîmes, such as the Arena of Nîmes and the Maison Carrée. Because of this, Nîmes is often referred to as the "French Rome".

Origins

Nimes is situated where the alluvial plain of the Vistrenque River abuts the hills of Mont Duplan to the northeast, Montaury to the southwest, and to the west Mt. Cavalier and the knoll of Canteduc.

Its name appears in inscriptions in Gaulish as dede matrebo Namausikabo ("he has given to the mothers of Nîmes") and "toutios Namausatis" ("citizen of Nîmes").

Nemausus was the god of the local Volcae Arecomici tribe.

History

4000–2000 BCE
The Neolithic site of Serre Paradis reveals the presence of semi-nomadic cultivators in the period 4000 to 3500 BCE on the site of Nîmes.

The menhir of Courbessac (or La Poudrière) stands in a field, near the aerodrome. This limestone monolith of over two metres in height dates to about 2500 BCE, and is considered the oldest monument of Nîmes.

1800–600 BCE
The Bronze Age has left traces of villages that were made out of huts and branches. The population of the site increased during the Bronze Age.

600–121 BCE

The hill of Mt. Cavalier was the site of the early oppidum which gave birth to the city. During the third and 2nd centuries BCE a surrounding wall was built with a dry-stone tower at the summit which was later incorporated into the Tour Magne. The Volcae Arecomici people settled around the spring at the foot of Mount Cavalier and built a sanctuary to Nemausus there.

The Warrior of Grezan is considered to be the most ancient indigenous sculpture in southern Gaul.

In 123 BCE the Roman general Quintus Fabius Maximus campaigned against Gallic tribes in the area and defeated the Allobroges and the Arverni, while the Volcae offered no resistance. The Roman province Gallia Transalpina was established in 121 BCE and from 118 BCE the Via Domitia was built through the later site of the city.

Roman period
The city arose on the important Via Domitia which connected Italy with Hispania.

Nîmes became a Roman colony as Colonia Nemausus sometime before 28 BCE, as witnessed by the earliest coins, which bear the abbreviation NEM. COL, "Colony of Nemausus". Veterans of Julius Caesar's legions in his Nile campaigns were given plots of land to cultivate on the plain of Nîmes.

Augustus started a major building program in the city, as elsewhere in the empire. He also gave the town a ring of ramparts 6 km long, reinforced by 14 towers; two gates remain today: the Porta Augusta and the Porte de France.

The Maison Carrée dating from the late 1st c. BCE is one of the best-preserved temples to be found anywhere in the former Roman Empire, and appears to be almost totally intact.

The great Nimes Aqueduct, many of whose remains can be seen today outside of the city, was built to bring water from the hills to the north. Where it crossed the river Gard between Uzès and Remoulins, the spectacular Pont du Gard was built.

The museum contains many fine objects including mosaic floors, frescoes and sculpture from rich houses and buildings found in excavations in and near the city. It is known that the town had a civil basilica, a curia, a gymnasium and perhaps a circus. The amphitheatre is very well preserved, dates from the end of the 2nd century and was one of the largest amphitheatres in the Empire. The so-called Temple of Diana dating from Augustus and rebuilt in the 2nd century was not a temple but was centred on a nymphaeum located within the Fontaine Sanctuary dedicated to Augustus and may have been a library.

The city was the birthplace of the family of emperor Antoninus Pius (138-161).

Emperor Constantine (306-337) endowed the city with baths.

It became the seat of the Diocesan Vicar, the chief administrative officer of southern Gaul.

The town was prosperous until the end of the 3rd century when successive barbarian invasions slowed its development. During the 4th and 5th centuries, the nearby town of Arles enjoyed more prosperity. In the early 5th century the Praetorian Prefecture was moved from Trier in northeast Gaul to Arles.

The Visigoths captured the city in 472.

4th–13th centuries

When the Visigoths were accepted into the Roman Empire, Nîmes was included in their territory in 472, even after the Frankish victory at the Battle of Vouillé (507). The urban landscape went through transformation with the Goths, but much of the heritage of the Roman era remained largely intact.

By 725, the Muslim Umayyads had conquered the whole Visigothic territory of Septimania including Nîmes. In 736–737, Charles Martel and his brother led an expedition to Septimania and Provence, and largely destroyed the city (in the hands of Umayyads allied with the local Gallo-Roman and Gothic nobility), including the amphitheatre, thereafter heading back north. The Muslim government came to an end in 752, when Pepin the Short captured the city. In 754, an uprising took place against the Carolingian king, but was put down, and count Radulf, a Frank, appointed as master of the city. After the events connected with the war, Nîmes was now only a shadow of the opulent Roman city it had once been. The local authorities installed themselves in the remains of the amphitheatre. 
Islamic burials have been found in Nîmes.

Carolingian rule brought relative peace, but feudal times in the 12th century brought local troubles, which lasted until the days of St. Louis. During that period Nîmes was jointly administered by a lay power resident in the old amphitheatre, where lived the Viguier and the Knights of the Arena, and the religious power based in the Bishop's palace complex, around the cathedral, its chapter and the Bishop's house; meanwhile the city was represented by four Consuls, who sat in the Maison Carrée.

Despite incessant feudal squabbling, Nîmes saw some progress both in commerce and industry as well as in stock-breeding and associated activities.

After the last effort by Raymond VII of Toulouse, St. Louis managed to establish royal power in the region which became Languedoc. Nîmes thus finally came into the hands of the King of France.

Period of invasions

During the 14th and 15th centuries the Rhone Valley underwent an uninterrupted series of invasions which ruined the economy and caused famine. Customs were forgotten, religious troubles developed (see French Wars of Religion) and epidemics, all of which affected the city. Nîmes, which was one of the Protestant strongholds, felt the full force of repression and fratricidal confrontations (including the Michelade massacre) which continued until the middle of the 17th century, adding to the misery of periodic outbreaks of plague.

17th century to the French Revolution

In the middle of the 17th century Nîmes experienced a period of prosperity. Population growth caused the town to expand, and slum housing to be replaced. To this period also belong the reconstruction of Notre-Dame-Saint-Castor, the Bishop's palace and numerous mansions (hôtels). This renaissance strengthened the manufacturing and industrial potential of the city, the population rising from 21,000 to 50,000 inhabitants.

In this same period the Fountain gardens, the Quais de la Fontaine, were laid out, the areas surrounding the Maison Carrée and the Amphitheatre were cleared of encroachments, whilst the entire population benefited from the atmosphere of prosperity.

From the French Revolution to the present
Following a European economic crisis that hit Nîmes with full force, the Revolutionary period awoke the slumbering demons of political and religious antagonism. The White Terror added to natural calamities and economic recession, produced murder, pillage and arson until 1815. Order was however restored in the course of the century, and Nîmes became the metropolis of Bas-Languedoc, diversifying its industry into new kinds of activity. At the same time the surrounding countryside adapted to market needs and shared in the general increase of wealth.

During the Second World War, the Maquis resistance fighters Jean Robert and Vinicio Faïta were executed at Nîmes on 22 April 1943. The Nîmes marshalling yards were bombed by American bombers in 1944.

The 2e Régiment Étranger d'Infanterie (2ºREI), the main motorised infantry regiment of the Foreign Legion, has been garrisoned in Nîmes since November 1983.

Geography

Climate 
Nîmes is one of the warmest cities in France. The city has a humid subtropical climate (Köppen: Cfa), with summers being too wet for it to be classified as a hot-summer Mediterranean climate (Köppen: Csa). Its slightly inland, southerly location results in hot air over the city during summer months: temperatures above 34 °C are common in July and August, whereas winters are cool but not cold. Nighttime low temperatures below 0 °C are common from December to February, while snowfall occurs every year.

Sights

Several important remains of the Roman Empire can still be seen in and around Nîmes:

 The elliptical Roman amphitheatre, of the 1st or 2nd century AD, is the best-preserved Roman arena in France. It was filled with medieval housing, when its walls served as ramparts, but they were cleared under Napoleon. It is still used as a bull fighting and concert arena.
 The Maison Carrée (Square House), a small Roman temple dedicated to sons of Agrippa was built c. 19 BCE. It is one of the best-preserved Roman temples anywhere. Visitors can watch a short film about the history of Nîmes inside.
 The 18th-century Jardins de la Fontaine (Gardens of the Fountain) built around the Roman thermae ruins.
 The nearby Pont du Gard, also built by Agrippa, is a well-preserved aqueduct that used to carry water across the small Gardon river valley.
 The nearby Mont Cavalier is crowned by the Tour Magne ("Great Tower"), a ruined Roman tower.
 The castellum divisorium, a rare vestige of a Roman water inlet system.

Later monuments include:
 The cathedral (dedicated to Saint Castor of Apt, a native of the city), occupying, it is believed, the site of the temple of Augustus, is partly Romanesque and partly Gothic in style.
 The Musée des Beaux-Arts de Nîmes
 The Musée de la Romanité, a museum dedicated to Roman history, located outside the amphitheatre

Pieces of modern achitecture can also be found : Norman Foster conceived the Carré d'art (1986), a museum of modern art and mediatheque, and Jean Nouvel designed the Nemausus, a post-modern residential ensemble.

Economy 
Nîmes is historically known for its textiles. Denim, the fabric of blue jeans, derives its name from this city (Serge de Nîmes). The blue dye was imported via Genoa from Lahore the capital of the Great Mughal.

Population

The population of Roman Nîmes (50 AD) was estimated at 50–60,000. The population of Nîmes increased from 128,471 in 1990 to 146,709 in 2012, yet the biggest growth the city ever experienced happened in 1968, with a growth of +23.5% compared to 1962.

Culture
From 1810 to 1822, Joseph Gergonne published a scientific journal specializing in mathematics from Nîmes called Annales de Gergonne.

The asteroid 51 Nemausa was named after Nîmes, where it was discovered in 1858.

Two times per year, Nîmes hosts one of the main French bullfighting events, Feria de Nîmes (festival), and several hundreds of thousands gather in the streets.

In 2005 Rammstein filmed their #1 live Album Völkerball in Nîmes.

Metallica's live DVD Français Pour une Nuit (English: French for One Night) was recorded in Nîmes, France, in the Arena of Nîmes on 7 July 2009, during the World Magnetic Tour.

Transportation
Nîmes-Alès-Camargue-Cévennes Airport serves the city, although its proximity with the much bigger Montpellier Airport has worked against its frequentation over the years. It is currently only served by Ryanair with an average of 3 flights per day, to destination such as London, Fez, Dublin or Marrakech.

The motorway A9 connects Nîmes with Orange, Montpellier, Narbonne, and Perpignan, the A54 with Arles and Salon-de-Provence.

Nîmes station is the central railway station, offering connections to Paris (high-speed rail), Marseille, Montpellier, Narbonne, Toulouse, Perpignan, Figueres and Barcelona in Spain and several regional destinations. There is another station in the Saint-Césaire quarter, Saint-Césaire station, with connections to Le Grau-du-Roi, Montpellier and Avignon.

The new contournement Nîmes – Montpellier high-speed rail line opened to passenger service on 15 December 2019 together with a new TGV station at Nîmes-Pont-du-Gard station, located 12km outside the city. The station is also located on the existing route between Nìmes and Avignon, thus providing connections between the new line and local rail service.

Nîmes bus station is adjacent to the city centre railway station. Buses connect the city with nearby towns and villages not served by rail.

Sport
The association football club Nîmes Olympique, currently playing in Ligue 2, is based in Nîmes.

World Archery Indoor World Cup takes place in Nîmes each year in mid January.

The local rugby union team is RC Nîmes.

The Olympic swimming champion Yannick Agnel was born in Nîmes.

The city hosted the opening stages of the 2017 Vuelta a España cycling race, and is often featured as a stage of the Tour de France.

Mayors
 Émile Jourdan, PCF (1965–1983)
 Jean Bousquet, UDF (1983–1995)
 Alain Clary, PCF (1995–2001)
 Jean-Paul Fournier, LR (since 2001)

Notable people
 
 
Jean-César Vincens-Plauchut (1755–1801), French politician

Twin towns – sister cities

Nîmes is twinned with:

 Preston, United Kingdom, since 1955
 Verona, Italy, since 1960
 Braunschweig, Germany, since 1962
 Prague 1, Czech Republic, since 1967
 Frankfurt (Oder), Germany, since 1976
 Córdoba, Spain
 Rishon LeZion, Israel, since 1986
 Meknes, Morocco, since 2005
 Fort Worth, United States, since 2019

See also
 Costières de Nîmes AOC
 Communes of the Gard department
 Councils of Nîmes
 Feria de Nîmes
 List of works by James Pradier
 The works of Maxime Real del Sarte

References

Further reading

External links

 City council website
 The official Web site of Roman Nîmes 

 
Communes of Gard
Cities in Occitania (administrative region)
Prefectures in France
Archaeological sites in France
Roman sites in France
Languedoc
Gard communes articles needing translation from French Wikipedia
Cities in France